Blimbing is a district (kecamatan) in Malang, East Java, Indonesia. Blimbing is the entrance to northern side of Malang city proper.

History 
In 1767, Malang was governed by a Duke of Malojo Kusumo who later surrendered to the Dutch colonial. To strengthen its position, the Dutch East Indies established a fortress on the side of the Brantas river. Followed by establishing a Dutch residence (loge) on either side of the fort. On 1 April 1914, the colonial government established Malang as Gemeente or Kotapraja, a government administered by the city council. On 12 November 1918, the city council of the election was formed. In 1919 the first Burgemeester was H.I. Bussemaker and in 1930 there was a change in village structure to become the Office of Environmental Government.

In 1942, in the Japanese era, there was a division of territory for Burgemeester, namely only the City area which oversees four neighborhoods or four Wijkmeester. After 1942, the Buergemeester area was divided into 3 sub-districts, namely Klojen, Blimbing and Kedung Kandang . In 1988, Malang City had 5 districts namely Blimbing, Klojen District, Kedungkandang, Lowokwaru, and Sukun. In 2002 the Blimbing District Office was originally located on Jalan Bantaran, moved location on Jalan Raden Intan Kav. 14 Malang.

Districts 
There are 11 urban villages (kelurahan) in Blimbing:

 Kesatrian, postal code 65121
 Polehan, postal code 65121
 Purwantoro, postal code 65122
 Bunulrejo, postal code 65123
 Pandanwangi, postal code 65124
 Blimbing, postal code 65125
 Purwodadi, postal code 65125
 Arjosari, postal code 65126
 Balearjosari, postal code 65126
 Polowijen, postal code 65126
 Jodipan, postal code 65127

Geography

Climate
The climate in Blimbing features tropical monsoon climate (Am) according to Köppen–Geiger climate classification system, as the climate precipitation throughout the year is greatly influenced by the monsoon, bordering with subtropical highland climate (Cwb). Most months of the year are marked by significant rainfall. The short dry season has little impact. The average temperature in Blimbing is 23.8 °C. In a year, the average rainfall is 2098 mm.

See also 

 Districts of East Java
 List of districts of Indonesia

References

External links 

 Official website of Kecamatan Blimbing
 Blog of Kecamatan Blimbing

Districts of East Java
Malang